is a male badminton player from Japan.

Career
Ikeda won the bronze medal in the 2007 BWF World Championships in men's doubles with Shuichi Sakamoto. They were defeated in semifinals by Jung Jae-sung and Lee Yong-dae of South Korea, 16–21, 12–21.

He has taken part at two Olympic Games, competing in the men's doubles with Shuichi Sakamoto in 2008 and the mixed doubles with Reiko Shiota in 2012.

Achievements

World Championships 
Men's doubles

External links
 BWF Player Profile

1980 births
Living people
People from Ōnojō
Sportspeople from Fukuoka Prefecture
Japanese male badminton players
University of Tsukuba alumni
Badminton players at the 2008 Summer Olympics
Badminton players at the 2012 Summer Olympics
Olympic badminton players of Japan
Badminton players at the 2010 Asian Games
Asian Games competitors for Japan